Artman is a surname. Notable people with the surname include:

Carl J. Artman, American politician
Corrie Artman (1907–1970), American football player
Wayne Artman (1936–2006), American sound engineer

See also
Artiman, village in Hamadan Province, Iran

The name of an Iranian general. Dariush's son and brother Xerxes Shah. And in Zoroastrian language it means good nature.